Shadowland Theatre is a community arts theatre and collective of visual and theatre artists on Toronto Island. It is a professional, not-for-profit theatre company and registered charity, incorporated in 1994.

History
The arts performance company Shadowland (legal name, Shadowland Repertory Company) was founded in 1982 by Whitney Smith and Victor Coleman with a mandate of producing musicals using shadow puppetry and other alternative theatrical media. The company was named after the early Hollywood screen monthly, Shadowland (magazine). The company's first production, Radio Ghost, a musical about the fictional meeting of Canadian radio inventor Reginald Fessenden and radio diva Jessica Dragonette, was co-written by Smith and Coleman and toured artist-run centres across Canada.

During the World Stage in 1982, the British company Welfare State International worked in collaboration with the Toronto Island community to produce the Tempest on Snake Island. Inspired by this production, Island residents Smith, Sarah Miller and Jerry Englar created proposals that raised funds for a second Shadowland production, along the same lines, to be part of the city's 1984 sesquicentennial celebrations. Welfare State principals Boris and Maggie Howarth were hired to assist and the result was Island Follies, a historical fantasia.

In 1985, Smith and Coleman handed over the company to the key group of Toronto Island artists who worked on the show – Kathleen Doody, Leida Englar, Jerry Englar, Brad Harley and Sarah Miller. The company was eventually renamed Shadowland Theatre.

Shadowland's early development was significantly influenced by Welfare State's format of professional artists engaging communities in collective performance, and this method has become the backbone of Shadowland's way of working ever since. Other major influences are Bread and Puppet Theater, Peter Minshall and Trinidad Carnival (leading to many years of involvement in Caribana parades) and ongoing working relationships with many Caribbean artists. These influences have contributed to Shadowland's bold and visually distinctive form of theatre and performance events.  In the past decade the theatre has created signature processional outdoor theatre performances and collaborated with a wide range of communities and artists from many disciplines.

Mandate and Mission

Shadowland Theatre Believes That

•	Live theatre is a basic component in the well-being of our societies.
•	Experiences of spectacle, mystery, and magic are essential to a full cultural life.
•	The raw, transformative power of live theatre is vital in our increasingly technological age.
•	Theatre should be accessible to all members of society.

Shadowland Theatre

•	Creates live theatre that is vital, entertaining, challenging, and has wide appeal.
•	Draws on ancient theatre traditions to create stories for our contemporary world.
•	Expresses collective aspirations through popular cultural forms.
•	Mixes the mythic and the mundane to create socially relevant, visually poetic theatre.
•	Works with communities and all generations to revitalize stories of place, time and the journey through life.
•	Invites non-professionals into the theatrical process as part of developing an articulate and expressive society.

Current projects
Annual Ward's Island Fire Parade

Mystery Play

Place at the Table

Crude-mentary Tales

It's Who We Are

Sarnia Art Walk Sarnia, Ontario

Productions
The Light That Stands Still Toronto Island

The Traveling Medicine Show  Toronto Island

Stories of Our Island Toronto Island

The Order of Good Cheer Toronto Island

The Essence of Ambrose Ichor Toronto Island

The Lost Supper Tarragon Theatre, Annex Theatre (2004) Toronto

The Bridge  Toronto Island (1980)

Right of Passage Toronto Island

Quixsand

Awards and honors
3 Dora Mavor Moore Award for Outstanding Costume

2009 Voted ‘’Best Grass Roots Theatre’’ in Toronto by NOW magazine

See also
Community art
Community theatre
Kensington Market
Mask
Kathleen McDonnell
Ruth Howard (artist)

External links
 Shadowland Theatre website
 Shadowland Theatre Facebook
 Shadowland at Parkdale Collegiate
 Toronto Island

Notes

Theatre companies in Toronto
Community theatre